Brahm Yadav is an Indian politician and member of the Indian National Congress. He is former General Secretary of Delhi Pradesh Congress Committee and former president of the Delhi Pradesh Youth Congress (1983-1990). He is also former chairman of Delhi Agriculture Marketing Board and vice chairman of Confederation of State Agricultural Marketing Boards.

Sh. Brahm Yadav was appointed Chairman of Delhi Agricultural Marketing Board on 30 May 2007. He comes from a farmer family of Delhi.

Sh. Brahm Yadav has also been elected as Sr. Vice-Chairman of COSAMB (Confederation of State Agricultural Marketing Boards), a body of all the State Agricultural Marketing Boards constituted to formulate policies and suggestions for upgrading marketing infrastructure to meet the emerging challenges of global competition.

Sh. Brahm Yadav worked as president of Delhi Pradesh Youth Congress from 1983 to 1990, as Municipal Councilor for a period of seven years, and as General Secretary of Delhi Pradesh Congress Committee under the Presidentship of Chaudhary Prem Singh, Late Sh. Deep Chand Bandhu, Smt. Sheila Dixit and Sh. Subhash Chopra. Sh. Yadav as Member of OBC Commission made efforts to include many Jats, Raya Rajputs and Rajbars as OBCs in the list for Delhi which were not included previously. He was also Chairman of the Rajdhani College, University of Delhi.

Education 
He graduated high school from Ramjas School in 1969, New Delhi.

Political career 
Yadav independently participated in the Delhi state assembly elections in 1998 from Rajendra Nagar. In 2015, he again contested the Delhi state assembly election being an Indian National Congress party candidate from Rajinder Nagar.

References 

Delhi politicians
Living people
Indian National Congress politicians
Year of birth missing (living people)